Ntot Ngijol Jean Pie His nickname is Jean (or John in English) (born 23 September 1986 in Yaoundé, Cameroon) is a football striker from Cameroon who plays for Khonkaen F.C. in the Thai Division 1 League as a striker.

External links 
Introduction New Player

Cameroonian footballers
Cameroonian expatriate footballers
Tonnerre Yaoundé players
Al Ahly SC players
Association football forwards
1986 births
Living people
Footballers from Yaoundé
Expatriate footballers in Thailand